Belmont, also spelled Belmonte, is an unincorporated community  in Sumter County, Alabama, United States.

History
Belmont was originally known as Belmonte, which is derived from the Italian words bel, meaning "beautiful" and monte, meaning "mountain." Belmont was founded in 1832 by David Blacksher, Joseph Gillespie, Sr., M. Martiere (one of the French settlers of Demopolis, and the Rushing family. A post office operated under the name Belmont from 1835 to 1914.

References

Unincorporated communities in Alabama
Unincorporated communities in Sumter County, Alabama